Christopher Buehlman (born 1969) is a novelist, comedian, playwright, and poet from St. Petersburg, Florida.

Early life and education
Buehlman was born in Tampa, Florida, in 1969, to an adolescent young woman originally from Tuscaloosa, Alabama. He was subsequently adopted by Joseph and Christeen Buehlman of Saint Petersburg, Florida. He attended Thom Howard Academy, a school for gifted and special needs students, from 1973 until 1982, when he enrolled at Northeast High School as a sophomore. He graduated from Northeast in 1985 at the age of sixteen. He briefly attended the University of Florida that year, then got his associate degree from St. Petersburg Junior College in 1989. He studied French language and History at Florida State University, graduating in 1994 with a bachelor's degree.

He speaks French with near fluency and is conversant in Spanish.

Work

Performance
A lifelong fan of renaissance festivals, Buehlman developed an act called “Christophe the Insultor,” roasting fair-goers for money at the behest of their friends, and has been touring with this act for 25 years. Early in his career the material was period and PG-13, performed in the lanes, but as the act moved on stage and into festival taverns it got bluer, more modern, and wilder, and has a strong cult following—most of his 18,000 Facebook followers have personally seen his show. He has also written and performed a one-man show about Christopher Marlowe, written a festival stage show called The Bastard Monks, and still performs his show Filthy Irish Stories for the Sterling Renaissance Festival in the summer.

Literary

His poetry has appeared in the Atlanta Review, and other literary and university publications. He was a finalist in the 2006 War Poetry Contest, and the 2008 Forward poetry prize list.

His first full-length play, Hot Nights for the War Wives of Ithaka, debuted at Jobsite Theater of Tampa in March 2012. He is the author of numerous short plays often performed out of doors.  He has also written and performed a one-man show about Christopher Marlowe.

He is the author of several novels, which range in setting from 14th century France to 1930s American South to modern-day New York.

Television 
In 2018, Buehlman authored a segment called “The Man in the Suitcase” for the Shudder reboot of Creepshow, described as "a nifty little tale of comeuppance...[which] delivers much of what’s been missing with Shudder’s show so far."

Awards
 2007 winner, Bridport Prize for poetry ("Wanton")
 2011 nominee, World Fantasy Award for best novel (Those Across The River)
 2014 nominee, Shirley Jackson Award for best novel (The Lesser Dead)

Bibliography
Novels
 Those Across The River (Ace, 2011)
 Between Two Fires (Ace, 2012)
 The Necromancer's House (Ace, 2013)
 The Lesser Dead (Berkley, 2014)
 The Suicide Motor Club (Berkley, 2016)
 The Blacktongue Thief (Tor, 2021)

Plays
 The Last Neanderthals: A Paleolithic Comedy
 Hot Nights for the War Wives of Ithaka
 A Sodomite’s Christmas in Elizabethan London
 Vulgar Sermons

Poetry
 "Bear Attacks"
 "Wanton"
 "Rapture"
 "Love Song for the Geminid Meteors"

References

External links

Christophe the Insultor webpage

1969 births
Florida State University alumni
American horror writers
American male poets
Living people
21st-century American poets
21st-century American male writers